Nizhnekamskneftekhim, also known as NKNK, is a large petrochemical company and largest specialized company in Europe headquartered in the city of Nizhnekamsk, Russia.

It is the largest producer of synthetic rubber and plastics in Russia. The company was established in 1967, and employs over 17,000 people.

External links
Nizhnekamskneftekhim homepage (English version)
Nizhnekamskneftekhim products(English version)

References

Chemical companies of Russia
Companies based in Tatarstan
Companies listed on the Moscow Exchange
Petrochemical companies
Chemical companies of the Soviet Union